Honfleur may refer to:-

Honfleur, a town in Calvados, France
Honfleur, Quebec, a village in Canada
Honfleur Gallery, an art gallery
, a steamship in service 1873-1911
, a passenger ferry planned to enter service in 2021